David Lawrence Gregg (July 21, 1819 – December 23, 1868) was an American politician from Pennsylvania. He rose to prominence in Illinois politics, first in the Illinois House of Representatives, then as United States Attorney, and Illinois Secretary of State. In 1853, Franklin Pierce appointed Gregg the Commissioner to the Kingdom of Hawaii to negotiate its annexation at the request of its king, Kamehameha III.  In response, he cited  the U.S. Constitution as not allowing annexation of a foreign state. (Texas had, in fact, been annexed a few years before with dubious legality.) His later years were spent in Carson City, Nevada.

Biography
David Lawrence Gregg was born in Pennsylvania on July 21, 1819. He moved west and settled in Joliet, Illinois, to practice law. He edited the Juliet Courier, the first paper in Will County, Illinois.  Gregg was elected to the Illinois House of Representatives in 1842, serving two two-year terms. Gregg then accepted an appointment by President James K. Polk as United States Attorney for the District of Illinois. He was a delegate to the Illinois Constitutional Convention of 1847, representing Cook County. In 1850, he was named the Illinois Secretary of State as a Democrat, filling the unexpired term of the deceased Horace S. Cooley. Gregg was then re-elected to a two-year term. He then was a presidential elector for the 1852 election. He was a leading candidate in 1852 for the Democratic nomination as Governor of Illinois, but was defeated by Joel Aldrich Matteson.

President Franklin Pierce then appointed Gregg the Commissioner to the Kingdom of Hawaii. He was involved with unsuccessful annexation discussions with the Hawaiian monarchy. In 1857, he left the office to become Hawaiian finance minister. Gregg returned to the United States, settling in Carson City, Nevada. President Andrew Johnson commissioned him receiver of public moneys for the district of lands subject to sale in the city.

Gregg married Rebecca Eads on September 1, 1850. He died in Carson City on December 23, 1868, and was buried in Lone Mountain Cemetery.

References

Further reading
 Joerger, Pauline King. A political biography of David Lawrence Gregg, American diplomat and Hawaiian official (Ayer, 1982).
 King, Pauline, ed., The Diaries of David Lawrence Gregg: An American Diplomat in Hawaii, 1853-1858 (1982)

1819 births
1868 deaths
Ambassadors of the United States to Hawaii
Editors of Illinois newspapers
Hawaiian Kingdom Finance Ministers
Illinois lawyers
Democratic Party members of the Illinois House of Representatives
Pennsylvania politicians
Politicians from Carson City, Nevada
People from Joliet, Illinois
Secretaries of State of Illinois
19th-century American journalists
American male journalists
19th-century American male writers
19th-century American politicians
Journalists from Illinois
People from Carson City, Nevada
Pennsylvania Democrats
19th-century American lawyers